Andriy Kurayev (born 19 December 1972) is a retired Ukrainian professional footballer who played as a goalkeeper and current football manager.

Career
Kurayev is a product of his native Donetsk's Shakhtar. His first trainer was Mykola Dehtyarev.

After spent his career in the different Ukrainian clubs, he played also a one season for the Russian FC Kuban side in 2002.

He retired from professional playing career in 2005.

References

External links
 Profile at Allplayers.in.ua
 Profile at Footballfacts (in Russian)

1972 births
Living people
Ukrainian footballers
Sportspeople from Donetsk
Association football goalkeepers
Ukrainian Premier League players
Ukrainian football managers
FC Shakhtar Donetsk players
FC Shakhtar-2 Donetsk players
FC Antratsyt Kirovske players
FC Metalurh Kostiantynivka players
FC Nyva Ternopil players
FC Metalurh Donetsk players
FC Metalurh-2 Donetsk players
FC Vorskla Poltava players
FC Kuban Krasnodar players
FC Kryvbas Kryvyi Rih players
FC Olimpik Donetsk players
FC Zorya Luhansk players
Ukrainian expatriate footballers
Expatriate footballers in Russia
Ukrainian expatriate sportspeople in Russia